The  is a 2-laned toll road in Chiba Prefecture, Japan. It is owned and operated by East Nippon Expressway Company.

Overview

The route is officially designated as a bypass for National Route 127, however it is functionally an extension of the Tateyama Expressway.

The road extends southward from the terminus of the Tateyama Expressway. It 
terminates at an intersection with a local road just to the north of Tateyama, a city on the Bōsō Peninsula.

The first section was opened to traffic in 1999 and the entire route was completed in 2004.

List of interchanges and features

 IC - interchange, PA - parking area, TN - tunnel

References

External links 

 East Nippon Expressway Company

Toll roads in Japan